Eugenio Arbones (1884, Ponteareas – 1936, Vigo) was a Spanish physician and socialist politician. He was a member of the Spanish Socialist Workers' Party and assassinated during the Spanish Civil War.

References

External links
Eugenio Arbones at the Congreso de los Diputados

1884 births
1936 deaths
People from Ponteareas
Spanish Socialist Workers' Party politicians
Members of the Congress of Deputies of the Second Spanish Republic
Politicians from Galicia (Spain)
Spanish people of the Spanish Civil War (Republican faction)